Mação is a municipality in the Santarém District in Portugal. The population in 2011 was 7,338, in an area of 399.98 km².

The present Mayor is Vasco António Mendonça Sequeira Estrela, elected by the Social Democratic Party. The municipal holiday is Easter Monday.

Parishes
Administratively, the municipality is divided into 6 civil parishes (freguesias):
 Amêndoa
 Cardigos
 Carvoeiro
 Envendos
 Mação, Penhascoso e Aboboreira
 Ortiga

Notable people 
 António Lino Neto (1873 in Mação – 1961) a Portuguese Catholic politician, lawyer and professor of Political Economy. 
 Duarte Marques (born 1981 in Mação) a Portuguese consultant, politician and member of the Assembly of the Republic

References

External links
Municipality official website

Towns in Portugal
Populated places in Santarém District
Municipalities of Santarém District
People from Mação